Thomas William Coke, 2nd Earl of Leicester  (26 December 1822 – 24 January 1909), known as Viscount Coke from 1837 to 1842, was a British peer.

Background

Leicester was the son of Thomas Coke, 1st Earl of Leicester, by his second wife Lady Anne Amelia Keppel. He succeeded to the earldom and Holkham Hall on his father's death in 1842.

Public life
Lord Leicester served as Lord-Lieutenant of Norfolk from 1846 to 1906 and was a member of the Council of the Duchy of Cornwall and Keeper of the Privy Seal. In 1873 he was made a Knight of the Garter.

Family
Lord Leicester married firstly, Juliana Whitbread (1825–1870), daughter of Samuel Charles Whitbread and Hon. Julia Trevor (d. 1858), on 20 April 1843. They had nine children:

Lady Julia Coke (1844–1931) she married Mervyn Wingfield, 7th Viscount Powerscourt on 26 April 1864. They have five children. Through their eldest son Mervyn Wingfield, 8th Viscount Powerscourt they are the maternal great-great-grandparents of Sarah, Duchess of York and the great-great-great-grandparents of Princess Eugenie of York wife of Jack Brooksbank.
Lady Anne Coke (1845 – 23 January 1876), she married Maj.-Gen. Edmund Manningham-Buller (son of Sir Edward Manningham-Buller, 1st Baronet) son of on 16 January 1874. They have two children. 
Lady Gertrude Coke (1847 – 28 November 1943), she married Charles Murray, 7th Earl of Dunmore on 5 April 1866. They have six children. 
Thomas William Coke, 3rd Earl of Leicester (20 July 1848 – 19 November 1941) he married The Honorable Alice White on 26 August 1879. They have five children. Though their eldest daughter Alexandra they are the paternal great-grandparents of James Robert Bruce Ogilvy.
Lady Mary Coke (1849 – 28 December 1929), she married William Legge, 6th Earl of Dartmouth on 18 December 1879. They have five children.
Lady Winifred Coke (1851 – 22 March 1940), she married Robert Clements, 4th Earl of Leitrim on 2 September 1873. They have eight children. 
Lady Margaret Coke (24 April 1852 – 2 August 1922), she married Henry Strutt, 2nd Baron Belper on 2 May 1874. They have eight children. 
Lady Mildred Coke (1854 – 12 May 1941), she married Thomas Anson, 3rd Earl of Lichfield on 5 November 1878. They have six children. 
Lt.-Col. Wenman Coke (20 November 1855 – 30 May 1931), died unmarried.

Lord Leicester married secondly, Hon. Georgina Cavendish, daughter of William Cavendish, 2nd Baron Chesham, on 26 August 1875. They had six children:

Major Hon. Richard Coke (20 August 1876 – 14 June 1964), he married Hon. Doreen O'Brien (niece of The Honorable Alice White though her eldest sister) on 21 December 1907 and they were divorced in 1927. They have five children. He remarried Elizabeth Vera Catherine Alice de Beaumont (maternal grandfather Thomas O'Hagan, 1st Baron O'Hagan) on 19 July 1932. They have three children. 
Lady Mabel Coke ( 1878 – 29 January 1967), she married James Luddington on 8 August 1929.
Lieutenant-Colonel Hon. Edward Coke (17 October 1879 – 4 September 1944), died unmarried.

Major Hon. Sir John (Jack) Spencer Coke (30 September 1880 – 23 December 1957), he married Hon. Dorothy Lawson (daughter of Harry Lawson, 1st Viscount Burnham) on 15 January 1907. They had three children; Celia, Gerald and Rosemary - later Baroness Hamilton of Dalzell. On 27 November 1951 it was reported that, as her Equerry, Sir Jack had accompanied Queen Mary on a visit to the annual exhibition of the Royal Society of Portrait Painters at the Royal Institute Galleries. He was appointed Knight Commander, Royal Victorian Order in 1953 and was Gentleman Usher to King George VI and Extra Gentleman Usher to Queen Elizabeth II. The Hon. Sir Jack and the Hon. Dorothy Coke are the parents of Celia Brooksbank née Coke (died 1996) who is the grandmother of Jack Brooksbank (husband to Princess Eugenie). In 2018, photos were published which revealed that Sir Jack Coke's daughter -  Celia Brooksbank  -  had been a guest at Hall Barn Estate, the family seat where her great grandfather, Edward Levy-Lawson, 1st Baron Burnham had enjoyed many shooting parties with King Edward VII.
Captain Hon. Reginald Coke (10 November 1883 – 30 April 1969), he married Katharine Ryder (granddaughter of Henry Ryder, 4th Earl of Harrowby) on 17 July 1924. They have two daughters.
Hon. Henry Coke ( 1888 – 1892).
Commander Hon. Lovel William Coke (19 August 1893 – 16 March 1966), died unmarried.

Ancestry

Notes

References 
Kidd, Charles, Williamson, David (editors). Debrett's Peerage and Baronetage (1990 edition). New York: St Martin's Press, 1990, 

CricketArchive: Earl of Leicester

1822 births
1909 deaths
2nd Earl of Leicester
Lord-Lieutenants of Norfolk
Thomas Coke
Deputy Lieutenants of Norfolk
English cricketers
Knights of the Garter
Marylebone Cricket Club cricketers
Presidents of the Marylebone Cricket Club
People from Holkham